Djurgårdens Idrottsförening, also known simply as Djurgårdens IF, is a Swedish professional football club based in Stockholm. The club have participated in 17 editions of the club competitions governed by UEFA, the chief authority for football across Europe. These include six seasons in the European Cup and Champions League, seven seasons in the UEFA Cup and Europa League, three seasons in the Cup Winners' Cup and one season in the Intertoto Cup. Counting all of the 50 games the side have played in UEFA competitions since their first entry into the European Cup in the 1955–56 season, the team's record stands at 15 wins, 15 draws and 20 defeats. 

Djurgården's 8–0 victory over Apollon Limassol of Cyprus in the 1996 UEFA Intertoto Cup is the club's most decisive win in European competitions, while the team's heaviest defeat is 6–0, against Bulgarian club Levski Sofia in the 1965–66 European Cup. With 15 caps, Toni Kuivasto has appeared in the most UEFA matches for Djungården, while Fredrik Dahlström and Kaj Eskelinen has scored the most goals with 5.

Key

 S = Seasons
 Pld = Played
 W = Games won
 D = Games drawn
 L = Games lost
 GF = Goals for
 GA = Goals against
 GD = Goal difference
 H = Home ground
 A = Away ground
 N = Neutral ground
 Final = Final
 SF = Semi-finals
 QF = Quarter-finals

 Group = Group stage
 PO = Play-off round
 3R = Round 3
 2R = Round 2
 1R = Round 1
 3QR = Third qualification round
 2QR = Second qualification round
 1QR = First qualification round
 QR = Qualification round
 aet = Match determined after extra time
 ag = Match determined by away goals rule
 ap = Match determined by penalty shoot-out
 Agg = Aggregated score
 Ref = Reference

Djurgården's score is noted first in all of the match results given below.

Overall record

By competition

By opponent club nationality

By club

Club ranking

Euro Club Index

Correct as of 17 September 2014. The table shows the position of Djurgårdens IF (highlighted), based on their Euro Club Index ranking, and the four clubs which are closest to Djurgårdens IF's position (the two clubs with the higher ranking and the two with the lower ranking).

Matches

UEFA Champions League

UEFA Europa League

UEFA Cup Winners' Cup

UEFA Intertoto Cup

Inter-Cities Fairs Cup

Notes

References

Djurgårdens IF Fotboll
Djurgardens IF